Leo Clasen (1906–1972) was imprisoned in the Sachsenhausen concentration camp because of his homosexuality. He wrote about his experiences in 1954–1955 in the homophile magazine Humanitas, Monatszeitschrift für Menschlichkeit und Kultur, which was published in seven parts under the pseudonym L. D. Classen von Neudegg. His account is one of the most significant records of the experience of homosexuals persecuted by Nazi Germany. He was born on 26 June 1906 in Neumünster, Schleswig-Holstein, Germany and was educated as a doctor.

See also
Persecution of homosexuals in Nazi Germany and the Holocaust

References

1906 births
1972 deaths
Homosexual concentration camp survivors
German gay writers
Sachsenhausen concentration camp survivors
People convicted under Germany's Paragraph 175
Physicians from Schleswig-Holstein
People from Neumünster
20th-century German LGBT people